The .375 Swiss P or 9.5×70mm, designated 375 Swiss P by the C.I.P., is a rebated rim, bottleneck, centerfire rifle cartridge. It was developed during the late 2010s as a high-powered, long-range cartridge for military snipers and the law enforcement sector.

Background
The .375 Swiss P is advertised by RUAG Ammotec as a cartridge that "fills the gap in ballistic performance between the .338 Lapua Magnum (8.6×70mm) and the .50 Browning Machine Gun (12.7×99mm)". Especially in regard to down-range kinetic energy, this performance gap is significant. As such it was designed to be relatively easily (re)chambered by just a rebarreling as a performance upgrade in sturdily built rifles originally designed around the .338 Lapua Magnum that also are encountered in .338 Norma Magnum and .300 Norma Magnum chamberings.

The .375 Swiss P shares its bolt face, rim diameter and overall length and maximum operating pressure with the .338 Lapua Magnum chambering. It features a larger  base diameter as found in the .500 Jeffery. This results in a (P1 - R1 = ) rebated rim. Rebated rim cartridges have a rim that is significantly smaller in diameter than the base of the case, serving only for extraction. Functionally the same as a rimless case, a rebated rim allows a gun to be easily converted to fire a larger-than-normal case capacity cartridge, as most of a gun's action (loading/extraction mechanism) does not need to be altered as long as the rim size is preserved.

Currently, the PGM Mini Hecate II, Voere with the X3, X4 and X5 and Unique Alpine with the TPG-3A4 (FN Ballista) offer the new chambering, and the TTS Xceed is also to be available in .375 Swiss P. At its introduction in 2021 .375 Swiss P ammunition is only available for military/law enforcement users.

Performance
RUAG Ammotec claims that the .375 Swiss P FMJ low drag projectile load offers performance superior to their .338 Lapua Magnum offerings, exhibiting additional supersonic range and reduced wind drift, while delivering greater kinetic energy down range.
The manufacturer states .375 Swiss P ball is loaded with a double base smokeless powder and the projectile has a 0.8014 (ICAO) G1 ballistic coefficient under International Standard Atmosphere sea level conditions (air density ρ = 1.225 kg/m3).
However, as of May 2021 .375 Swiss P AP loads are not commercially available.

See also
 9 mm caliber
 List of rifle cartridges

Notes

References

External links
 C.I.P. TDCC sheet 375 SWISS P
 .375 SWISS P Ball
 .375 SWISS P Ball Fact Sheet
 .375 SWISS P Fact Sheet Brochure

Pistol and rifle cartridges
Weapons and ammunition introduced in 2021